Miralles Tagliabue may refer to:

Enric Miralles
Benedetta Tagliabue